John Hutton (died 9 November 1596), of Dry Drayton, Cambridgeshire, was an English politician.

He was the son of Thomas Hutton of Dry Drayton.

He was a Justice of the Peace for Cambridgeshire from c. 1559 and appointed High Sheriff of Cambridgeshire and Huntingdonshire for 1559–60 and 1574–75.

He was a Member (MP) of the Parliament of England for Cambridgeshire in 1563, 1571 and 1572.

He married twice: firstly Sybil, the daughter of Sir John Hynde and widow of Sir John Cutts; and secondly Elizabeth (daughter of William Laurence of St. Ives, Huntingdonshire). He had no children. His widow subsequently married William Hynde, nephew of Hutton's first wife.

References

Year of birth missing
1596 deaths
People from Dry Drayton
High Sheriffs of Cambridgeshire and Huntingdonshire
English MPs 1563–1567
English MPs 1571
English MPs 1572–1583